Huntington Township is the name of some places in the U.S. state of Pennsylvania:

Huntington Township, Adams County, Pennsylvania
Huntington Township, Luzerne County, Pennsylvania

Pennsylvania township disambiguation pages

it:Huntington#Toponimi